Girl Rising is a 2013 documentary film produced by Kayce Freed, Tom Yellin and Holly Gordon at The Documentary Group, in partnership with Paul G. Allen and Jody Allen of Vulcan Productions. It was directed by Academy Award nominee Richard E. Robbins and features narration by Anne Hathaway, Cate Blanchett, Selena Gomez, Liam Neeson, Sushmita Sen, Priyanka Chopra, Chloë Grace Moretz, Freida Pinto, Salma Hayek, Meryl Streep, Alicia Keys and Kerry Washington.

The movie tells the stories of nine girls from nine countries: (Sierra Leone, Haiti, Ethiopia, Afghanistan, Peru, Egypt, Nepal, India and Cambodia). Each girl had her story written by a writer from her country and voiced by renowned actors. Their stories reflect their struggles to overcome societal or cultural barriers. The writers are Loung Ung (Cambodia), Edwidge Danticat (Haiti), Manjushree Thapa (Nepal), Mona Eltahawy (Egypt), Maaza Mengiste (Ethiopia), Sooni Taraporevala (India), Maria Arana (Peru), Aminatta Forna (Sierra Leone), Zarghuna Kargar (Afghanistan). The girls' names are Sokha (Cambodia), Wadley (Haiti), Suma (Nepal), Yasmin (Egypt), Azmera (Ethiopia), Ruksana (India), Senna (Peru), Mariama (Sierra Leone) and Amina (Afghanistan).

References

External links
 
 
 

2013 films
Year of work missing
2013 documentary films
CNN Films films
Vulcan Productions films
Films scored by Lorne Balfe
Films scored by Rachel Portman
2010s American films